Blanc-Mesnil is a village and former commune in the Seine-Maritime department, northwestern France. Since 1822, it is part of Sainte-Marguerite-sur-Mer.

Former communes of Seine-Maritime